Baegunsan or Mount Baegun is a mountain in South Korea. Its area extends across the city of Pocheon, Gyeonggi Province(Gyeonggi-do) and into the county of Hwacheon, Gangwon Province (Gangwon-do).

See also
List of mountains in Korea

Notes

References

Mountains of Gyeonggi Province
Mountains of Gangwon Province, South Korea
Pocheon
Hwacheon County
Mountains of South Korea